The Brush Creek Bridge, near Coyville, Kansas, was built in 1930.  It was listed on the National Register of Historic Places in 1985.

References

Bridges on the National Register of Historic Places in Kansas
Bridges completed in 1930
Wilson County, Kansas
Bridges in Kansas